Pławna Górna  is a village in the administrative district of Gmina Lubomierz, within Lwówek Śląski County, Lower Silesian Voivodeship, in south-western Poland. Prior to 1945 it was in Germany.

It lies approximately 8 kilometres (5 mi) north-east of Lubomierz, 7 kilometres (4 mi) south of Lwówek Śląski, and 101 kilometres (63 mi) west of the regional capital Wrocław.

Culture 
In the 18th century house that belonged to Dietrich family before the 2nd world war is a Muzeum Przesiedleńców i Wypędzonych. It is a museum dedicated to people who were resettled from east Poland into this village after the war.

References

Villages in Lwówek Śląski County